Gonystylus velutinus is a tree in the family Thymelaeaceae.

Description
Its bark is pale to reddish brown.

Distribution and habitat
Gonystylus velutinus is native to Sumatra and Borneo. Its habitat is forest to  altitude.

References

velutinus
Trees of Sumatra
Trees of Borneo
Plants described in 1950